Christopher John Cattlin (born 25 June 1946 in Milnrow, Lancashire) is a former professional footballer who played as a defender for Huddersfield Town, Coventry City and Brighton & Hove Albion.

He became manager of Brighton & Hove Albion on 1 October 1983, and left that position on 30 April 1986, and now runs a rock shop in the city. He also co-owns a racehorse, Ajigolo, with former Southampton and England forward Mick Channon.

References

1946 births
Living people
People from Milnrow
Association football defenders
English footballers
England under-23 international footballers
English football managers
English Football League players
Huddersfield Town A.F.C. players
Coventry City F.C. players
Brighton & Hove Albion F.C. players
Brighton & Hove Albion F.C. managers
English businesspeople in retailing